
Gmina Żukowo is an urban-rural gmina (administrative district) in Kartuzy County, Pomeranian Voivodeship, in northern Poland.

Villages
Apart from the town of Żukowo, Gmina Żukowo contains the villages and settlements of Babi Dół, Banino, Barniewice, Borkowo, Borowiec, Chwaszczyno, Czaple, Elżbietowo, Glincz, Łapino Kartuskie, Leźno, Lniska, Małkowo, Miszewko, Miszewo, Niestępowo, Nowy Świat, Otomino, Pępowo, Piaski, Przyjaźń, Rębiechowo, Rutki, Skrzeszewo Żukowskie, Stara Piła, Sulmin, Tuchom, Widlino and Żukowo-Wieś.

Neighbouring gminas
Gmina Żukowo is bordered by the towns of Gdańsk and Gdynia, and by the gminas of Kartuzy, Kolbudy, Przodkowo, Przywidz, Somonino and Szemud.

References
Polish official population figures 2006

Kashubia
Zukowo
Kartuzy County
Bilingual communes in Poland